"Born Again" is the second single from the album Silence Is Easy by British pop band Starsailor, released in 2003. It peaked at number 40 in the UK Charts.

Music video 
The video enters a painting and shows the images of a couple living in a farm house.  The lady (interpreted by Violet Wilson) finds an envelope in the jacket from her lover after he leaves her. She is seen drowning in a lake, being carried by her lover, and sitting on a bed watching the window with a sad expression on her face. The alternative version contains more scenes of the couple inside this peaceful "natural scene" of the painting where they live, while the original video shows the band playing "Born Again."

Track listings

CD, 7"
 "Born Again" (Radio Edit) - 4:46
 "At the End of a Show" - 4:14

Limited edition CD (with 4 postcard prints)
 "Born Again" (Radio Edit) - 4:46
 "White Dove" (Original Demo) - 3:19
 "Silence Is Easy" (Live) - 5:07
 "Born Again" (Enhanced Video - Alternative Version)

DVD
 "Born Again" (Video)
 "White Dove" (Original Demo) (Audio)
 "A Short Documentary" (Video)

Charts

References 

2003 singles
Starsailor (band) songs
Songs written by James Walsh (musician)
Songs written by James Stelfox
Songs written by Barry Westhead
2003 songs
EMI Records singles
Songs written by Ben Byrne